Proceratophrys melanopogon is a species of frog in the family Odontophrynidae. It is endemic to Serra do Mar in Rio de Janeiro and São Paulo states, Brazil.

Description
It has a rounded snout and the fingers are unwebbed and have swollen tips. The skin on the back is smooth or has small warty tubercles and on the side has glandular warts. There is a distinctive ridge running from above the eye to the pelvis. The colour is some shade of brown and there are several irregular dark blotches.

Distribution and habitat
Proceratophrys melanopogon is endemic to the states of São Paulo and Rio de Janeiro in southeastern Brazil. Records from Minas Gerais probably refer to Proceratophrys mantiqueira. It is found in forests, living among the leaf litter and breeding in small streams.

Breeding
Proceratophrys melanopogon is an explosive breeder. After heavy rain has fallen creating temporary pools and streamlets, large numbers of male frogs gather together and call to attract females. The call is a multipulsed series of notes with a frequency of about 1179 Hz and is heard between 6pm and midnight. The tadpoles develop in slow-moving streams.

Status
The total range of Proceratophrys melanopogon is probably less than  but the primary and old secondary forest it inhabits does not seem to be significantly threatened by tourism and human development, and part of it is in national parks or in otherwise protected areas. This frog is quite common and though its numbers may be decreasing, they are not doing so at a fast enough rate as to make the species threatened, and the IUCN lists it as being of "least concern".

References

melanopogon
Endemic fauna of Brazil
Amphibians of Brazil
Amphibians described in 1926
Taxa named by Alípio de Miranda-Ribeiro
Taxonomy articles created by Polbot